The 2020 New Orleans Bowl was a college football bowl game played on December 23, 2020, with kickoff at for 3:00 p.m. EST (2:00 p.m. local CST) on ESPN. It was the 20th edition of the New Orleans Bowl, and was one of the 2020–21 bowl games concluding the 2020 FBS football season. Sponsored by freight shipping company R+L Carriers, the game was officially known as the R+L Carriers New Orleans Bowl.

Teams
The 2020 New Orleans Bowl was contested by the Georgia Southern Eagles, from the Sun Belt Conference, and the Louisiana Tech Bulldogs, from Conference USA. The game was the first matchup between the two teams.

Georgia Southern

Georgia Southern of the Sun Belt accepted their bid on December 14, 2020. The Eagles entered the bowl with an overall record of 7–5 (4–3 in conference play). This was Georgia Southern's first appearance in the New Orleans Bowl.

Louisiana Tech

Louisiana Tech of Conference USA accepted their bid on December 14, 2020. The Bulldogs entered the bowl with an overall record of 5–4 (4–2 in conference play). This was Louisiana Tech's second New Orleans bowl appearance, their first coming in 2015, when they defeated Arkansas State, 47–28.

Game summary

Statistics

Records
The 3 points scored by Louisiana Tech tied with the bowl record for the fewest points allowed.  The game also broke other records, such as the largest margin of victory, most rushing yards (by Georgia Southern), fewest yards allowed (by Louisiana Tech).  Other individual records include: tying most rushing touchdowns (Shai Werts of Georgia Southern's 3 TDs), tying most interceptions (Justin Birdsong of Georgia Southern's 2 interceptions), and longest touchdown pass (Shai Werts to Khaleb Hood for 65 yards).

See also
 2021 Sugar Bowl, played at the same venue 9 days later

References

External links

Game statistics at statbroadcast.com

New Orleans Bowl
New Orleans Bowl
New Orleans Bowl
New Orleans Bowl
Georgia Southern Eagles football bowl games
Louisiana Tech Bulldogs football bowl games